Hymenobacter ocellatus  is a bacterium from the genus of Hymenobacter which has been isolated from dung of an antelope in South Africa.

References

Further reading

External links
Type strain of Hymenobacter ocellatus at BacDive -  the Bacterial Diversity Metadatabase	

ocellatus
Bacteria described in 2006